The Caird Coast is the portion of the coast of Coats Land lying between the terminus of Stancomb-Wills Glacier, in 20º00´W, and the vicinity of the Hayes Glacier, in 27º54´W. Shackleton named it for Sir James Key Caird, patron of the expedition.

In December 1914 and January 1915, as part of the ill-fated British Imperial Trans-Antarctic Expedition, Ernest Shackleton continued the exploration southward, joining Bruce's discovery to land which Wilhelm Filchner had discovered from the Deutschland in 1912.

References 

Coasts of Antarctica
Landforms of Coats Land
Argentine Antarctica
British Antarctic Territory